Garypus is a genus of pseudoscorpions in the family Garypidae. There are at least 20 described species in Garypus.

Species
These 26 species belong to the genus Garypus:

 Garypus armeniacus Redikorzev, 1926 i c g
 Garypus beauvoisi (Savigny, 1929) g
 Garypus beauvoisii (Audouin, 1826) i c g
 Garypus bonairensis Beier, 1936 i c g
 Garypus californicus Banks, 1909 i c g b
 Garypus darsahensis Mahnert, 2007 i c g
 Garypus decolor Muchmore, 1991 i c g
 Garypus floridensis Banks, 1895 i c g
 Garypus giganteus Chamberlin, 1921 i c g
 Garypus gracilis V. F. Lee, 1979 i c g
 Garypus guadalupensis Chamberlin, 1930 i c g
 Garypus insularis Tullgren, 1907 i c g
 Garypus japonicus Beier, 1952 i c g
 Garypus krusadiensis Murthy and Ananthakrishnan, 1977 i c g
 Garypus levantinus Navás, 1925 i c g
 Garypus longidigitus Hoff, 1947 i c g
 Garypus maldivensis Pocock, 1904 i c g
 Garypus marmoratus Mahnert, 1982 i c g
 Garypus nicobarensis Beier, 1930 i c g
 Garypus occultus Mahnert, 1982 i c g
 Garypus ornatus Beier, 1957 i c g
 Garypus pallidus Chamberlin, 1923 i c g
 Garypus saxicola Waterhouse, 1878 i c g
 Garypus sini Chamberlin, 1923 i c g
 Garypus titanius Beier, 1961 i c g
 Garypus viridans Banks, 1909 i c g

Data sources: i = ITIS, c = Catalogue of Life, g = GBIF, b = Bugguide.net

References

Further reading

External links

 

Pseudoscorpion genera